Funny Man or Funnyman may refer to:

People
 A comedian
 One member of a comedic double act
 A person who tells jokes
 A person who performs physical comedy

Entertainment
 Funny Man (film), a 1994 British film written and directed by Simon Sprackling
 A Funny Man, a 2011 Danish drama film directed by Martin Zandvliet
 Funny Man (TV series), a 1981 Thames Television series for ITV
Funnyman (comics), a comic book character

Music
 Funny Man (album), a 1989 album from American country music and novelty songwriter and singer Ray Stevens
"Funnyman", a KT Tunstall song from the album Drastic Fantastic
 Funny Man, a member of the American rap rock band Hollywood Undead
 "Funny Man", a 2000 single by Jamaican dancehall artist Baby Cham from his album Wow... The Story

See also 
 Funny Girl (disambiguation)
 Straight man (comedy)
 Practical joker (disambiguation)
 Joker (disambiguation)
 Jester (disambiguation)
 Jokester (disambiguation)
 Comedian (disambiguation)
 Comic (disambiguation)